Lenn Haruki Sakata (born June 8, 1954) is an American former professional baseball player who played in the Major Leagues primarily as a utility player from 1977 to 1987 and was a member of the Baltimore Orioles 1983 World Series Championship team. He was the second Asian American to play Major League Baseball.  He is Yonsei (fourth-generation American of Japanese ancestry). Sakata graduated from Kalani High School in 1971.  Sakata played college baseball for the Gonzaga Bulldogs of Gonzaga University in Spokane, Washington.

Sakata was acquired by the Orioles from the Brewers for John Flinn on December 6, 1979. He began 1981 as a reserve and missed time in May due to a sprained ankle. In September, he took over the shortstop position, replacing longtime Oriole shortstop Mark Belanger. Sakata was humble about this, saying, "I never looked at myself as the next Mark Belanger. It would have been pointless and arrogant for anybody to feel that way." He was the starting shortstop for the Orioles when Cal Ripken Jr., began his consecutive games played streak. When manager Earl Weaver decided to shift Ripken to short at the beginning of July, 1982, he moved Sakata to second, keeping Sakata in the lineup.

Sakata is remembered in Orioles lore during the 1983 pennant race when he substituted to play catcher, a position he had not played since childhood, in the tenth inning of the August 24, 1983 game at Baltimore's Memorial Stadium. The Orioles had replaced their starting catcher and his backup while rallying to tie the game in the ninth inning. Three Toronto Blue Jays hitters reached first base; each one took a big lead, thinking it would be easy to steal a base on Sakata. Tippy Martinez proceeded to pick each  Blue Jays base runner off first base. Sakata then hit a walk-off home run in the bottom of the tenth to win the game.

After his playing career ended, Sakata began coaching in the minor league system.  He has served as manager of the Modesto A's (1989), San Jose Giants (1999, 2001, 2004–2007), Bakersfield Blaze (2000), and Fresno Grizzlies (2002).  On May 31, 2007 Sakata notched his 527th victory as a California League manager, setting the record for lifetime wins. Sakata became the farm team manager of the Chiba Lotte Marines in Japan in 2008. He returned to American baseball in 2011, becoming the hitting coach for Asheville Tourists (Low-A). After managing the Modesto Nuts from 2012-2013, Sakata rejoined the San Jose Giants in 2014 and was succeeded  on January 10, 2015 by Russ Morman taking over as manager beginning the 2015 season. In 2020, Sakata was named the new manager of the Salem-Keizer Volcanoes. Sakata has returned to the San José Giants for the 2021 season. 

Sakata was selected by CNN Sports Illustrated as one of the 50 greatest sports figures in Hawaii's history and is a member of the Hawaii Sports Hall of Fame located in the Bishop Museum. Sakata is also a member of Gonzaga University's Sports Hall of Fame.  In 2018 he was inducted to the California League Hall of Fame for his success as a manager.

References

External links
, or Retrosheet, or SABR Biography Project, or Pura Pelota

1954 births
American baseball players of Japanese descent
American expatriate baseball players in Canada
Baltimore Orioles players
Baseball players from Honolulu
Columbus Clippers players
Gonzaga Bulldogs baseball players
Gonzaga University alumni
Hawaii people of Japanese descent
Living people
Major League Baseball second basemen
Milwaukee Brewers players
Minor league baseball coaches
Minor league baseball managers
New York Yankees players
Nippon Professional Baseball coaches
Oakland Athletics players
Rochester Red Wings players
San Bernardino Pride players
Spokane Indians players
Sportspeople from Honolulu
Tacoma Tigers players
Thetford Mines Miners players
Tigres de Aragua players
American expatriate baseball players in Venezuela
Treasure Valley Chukars baseball players
Vancouver Canadians players